MRG can mean

 Millennium Research Group
 Minorities Research Group
 Minority Rights Group International
 Mouvement des Radicaux de Gauche, later Left Radical Party, France
 Red Hat Messaging/Realtime/Grid
 Mad River Glen, ski area in Fayston, Vermont
 The IATA code for Mareeba Airfield in Queensland, Australia